Jharkot (झारकोट) is a village in Mustang District in the Dhaulagiri Zone of central Nepal.
It is located at an elevation of 3519m between Kagbeni, on the banks of the Kali Gandaki river, and the Hindu pilgrimage site of Muktinath.

Populated places in Mustang District